Tribalism is the second compilation album by Enter Shikari, released on 22 February 2010. The album contains two brand new tracks, b-sides, remixes and live tracks. A limited edition version of the album was released in a boxset package also containing a sticker, poster and badges. Only 1,000 of this edition were made.

History
Songs on the compilation were recorded between 2007 and 2009. The first single "Thumper" was released on 12 February 2010. The video for "Thumper" shows the band in black-and-white and ending up looking cartoon-esque, not unlike A-Ha's "Take On Me", although the band members' faces are distorted, with wide mouths, pointed noses and sunken eyes. This type of animation is called rotoscoping. The video was directed and animated by Joseph Pierce.

"All Eyes On the Saint" was previously released as bonus track for the Japanese and American iTunes version of Common Dreads. The song itself is about the execution of Saint Alban.

Track listing
It has the following track listing:

Personnel
Roughton "Rou" Reynolds - vocals, electronics
Liam "Rory" Clewlow - guitar, vocals
Chris Batten - bass, vocals, co-lead vocals on "Tribalism" and "We Can Breathe in Space"
Rob Rolfe - drums, percussion

References

External links

Tribalism at YouTube (streamed copy where licensed)

Enter Shikari compilation albums
2010 compilation albums
Ambush Reality compilation albums
Drum and bass compilation albums